Sir Edward Clay KCMG (born 21 July 1945) is a retired British diplomat, formerly a High Commissioner and ambassador.

During his time as British High Commissioner in Kenya, Sir Edward earned a reputation for his willingness to speak out against corruption at high levels of the Kenyan government. In a speech made in July 2004 to the British Business Association of Kenya, he famously remarked that the "gluttony" of senior figures in the government of President Mwai Kibaki was causing them to "vomit all over our shoes". His outspoken views earned him widespread popularity among Kenyan citizens but he became persona non grata with the Kenyan government. More surprisingly, his own (British) government also came to see him as problematic, undermining the distribution of British aid funding to Kenya.

He won a scholarship to study at Magdalen College, Oxford.

Career summary
1968: joined Foreign Office, London
1970: posted to British High Commission, Nairobi
1973: appointed Second (later First) Secretary, British Embassy in Sofia
1975-1979: Foreign and Commonwealth Office, London
1979-1982: First Secretary, British Embassy in Budapest
1982-1985: Foreign and Commonwealth Office, London
1993-1997: British High Commissioner to Uganda
1994-1995: Non-resident British ambassador to Rwanda
1994-1996: Non-resident British ambassador to Burundi
1997-1999: Director, Public Diplomacy and Public Services, FCO, London
1999-2001: British High Commissioner to Cyprus
2001-2005: British High Commissioner to Kenya

Honours
1994, CMG
2005, Honorary Doctorate of Laws from University of Sunderland

Retirement
Sir Edward is now a Trustee of Leonard Cheshire, a disability organisation, and International Alert, a peacebuilding NGO.

Family
Clay married Anne Stroud in 1969, and they had three daughters.

References

Who's Who 2003 (A. & C. Black, London, 2003) page 415

External links
Kenya tells former envoy Clay he is 'persona non grata'

Knights Commander of the Order of St Michael and St George
High Commissioners of the United Kingdom to Cyprus
High Commissioners of the United Kingdom to Kenya
1945 births
Living people
People educated at Pocklington School
Alumni of Magdalen College, Oxford
High Commissioners of the United Kingdom to Uganda
Ambassadors of the United Kingdom to Rwanda
Ambassadors of the United Kingdom to Burundi